Frank Allison James III (born 1953) is an American theologian and academic administrator. He is the president of Missio Seminary in Philadelphia, Pennsylvania. He formerly served as Provost and Professor of Historical Theology at Gordon-Conwell Theological Seminary. His expertise is Reformation history, focusing especially on the life and thought of Peter Martyr Vermigli. He has authored and edited several books.

Education
Frank James received his BA from Texas Tech University and an MA at Westminster Theological Seminary. He also has received two doctorates. The first was a Doctor of Philosophy degree from the University of Oxford under the supervision of Alister McGrath. The second was from Westminster Theological Seminary.

Career
Frank James has taught at several universities and seminaries. During his doctoral research he taught at Villanova and Westmont College. After his DPhil research, he became Professor of Historical Theology at Reformed Theological Seminary in Orlando, where he also served as President from 2004 to 2009. He is also one of the founding members of the Reformation Commentary on Scripture (with Intervarsity Press).

Works

Thesis

Books

Edited by

References

Gordon–Conwell Theological Seminary faculty
Westminster Theological Seminary alumni
Living people
Texas Tech University alumni
Alumni of the University of Oxford
Presidents of Calvinist and Reformed seminaries
American Calvinist and Reformed theologians
Place of birth missing (living people)
1953 births